Hunt Glacier is a small, deeply entrenched glacier on the east coast of Victoria Land, Antarctica, entering Granite Harbour north of Dreikanter Head. It was mapped by the British Antarctic Expedition, 1910–13, and probably named for H.A. Hunt, an Australian meteorologist who assisted in writing the scientific reports of the earlier British Antarctic Expedition, 1907–09.

See also
List of glaciers in the Antarctic
Red Buttress Peak

References

Glaciers of Victoria Land
Scott Coast